Dro (Dró in local dialect) is a town and comune in Trentino in the northern Italian region of Trentino-Alto Adige/Südtirol. It sits in the deep Sarca river valley, and as of the 2021 census Dro had a population of 5,047. Dro is divided in two frazioni, Pietramurata and Ceniga.

References

Cities and towns in Trentino-Alto Adige/Südtirol
Garda Mountains